Indian actor, singer, songwriter, and film producer Amrinder Gill has released over eight studio albums, fifteen singles, and fifty-seven songs in film soundtracks. He made his singing debut in 1999, in program Kala Doria with his track "Sanu Ishq Ho Gaya" on Jalandhar Doordarshan.

Gill's debut album, Apni Jaan Ke, was released by Goyal Music in 2000. The album was followed by Chan Da Tukda and Ek Vaada, which were released by Finetouch next years consequently. In 2005, Gill released his fourth studio album Dildarian under label Music Waves and Kamlee Records. The album received various nominations at ETC Awards.

Studio albums

Singles

As featured artist

As executive producer

Film soundtrack

References 

Amrinder Gill albums
Gill, Amrinder